Capture of Ormuz may refer to:

Capture of Ormuz (1507),  Portuguese Afonso de Albuquerque attacking Hormuz Island
Capture of Ormuz (1622),  Anglo-Persian force taking over the Portuguese garrison at Hormuz Island